Finn Wentworth (born 1958) is an entrepreneur, philanthropist, and investor in major commercial real estate and sports ventures in the United States.

Career

Wentworth was COO and CEO of Yankeenets, the holding company for the New York Yankees, New Jersey Nets, and New Jersey Devils professional sports teams.  As an owner who also served as the leading executive of those franchises, Wentworth was one of the founders of the YES Network national sports network along with Leo Hindery. Wentworth has also held the position of President and CEO of the New Jersey Nets NBA team.  During his tenure with the teams, the Yankees won two world championships, the Devils won two Stanley Cups, and the Nets twice won the NBA Eastern Conference finals.  Wentworth is an owner and founding partner along with David Welsh of Normandy Real Estate Partners based in Morristown, New Jersey, with offices in Washington D.C., New York City, and Boston, Massachusetts.  Prior to starting Normandy and his involvement in professional sports, Wentworth was one of the founders of Gale and Wentworth.

Other interests

Wentworth is a trustee of the Yogi Berra Museum and Learning Center.  He has also served on the board of the Princeton National Regatta Association, an organization that supports the U.S. Olympic Rowing Team, and received the Jack Kelly Citizenship Award from the U.S. Rowing Association.

Education
He is a 1980 graduate of Lehigh University in Bethlehem, Pennsylvania, where he was a member of the Board of Trustees.  Wentworth majored in marketing, was in the Delta Phi fraternity, the Social Chairman for the Interfraternity Council (IFC) and, on the rugby, cross country, and track teams.  Wentworth was a miler in track and a fullback for rugby.

Wentworth attended Morristown-Beard School in Morristown, New Jersey.

References

External links 
New York Yankees, MLB team,  
Normandy Real Estate Partners
NJBIZ presents the 50 Wealthiest New Jerseyans

Living people
Lehigh University alumni
American chief operating officers
American chief executives of professional sports organizations
Morristown-Beard School alumni
1958 births